Paiwas is a municipality in the South Caribbean Coast Autonomous Region of Nicaragua.

Municipalities of the South Caribbean Coast Autonomous Region